Roscoe Robinson Jr. (October 11, 1928 – July 22, 1993) was the first African American to become a four-star general in the United States Army. He served as the United States representative to the NATO Military Committee. Robinson previously served as commanding general of the 82nd Airborne Division and then of United States Army, Japan.

Early life and education
Born and raised in St. Louis, Missouri, Robinson graduated from Sumner High School in January 1946 and then attended Stowe College for one semester. He studied at Saint Louis University for a year and then transferred to the United States Military Academy at West Point in 1947. He graduated with a B.S. degree in military engineering in 1951. Robinson graduated from the advanced course at the United States Army Infantry School in 1957. He then went on to graduate from the Command and General Staff College at Fort Leavenworth, Kansas in 1963. The following year he received his master's degree from the University of Pittsburgh in public and international affairs. Robinson later graduated from the National War College in 1969.

Career

After graduating from West Point, Robinson served in the Korean War in 1952 as a platoon leader and rifle company commander. For his actions he received the Bronze Star. Sent back to the United States a year later he became an instructor in the Airborne Department of the Army Infantry School.

In 1967, he served as commander of the 2nd Battalion, 7th Cavalry, 1st Cavalry Division in Vietnam. For his achievements there he received the Legion of Merit, the Distinguished Flying Cross, 11 Air Medals, and two Silver Stars.

After Vietnam he served at the National War College as the executive officer to the Chief of Staff. He then served on the headquarters staff of the United States Pacific Command in Hawaii before becoming commander of the 2nd Brigade, 82nd Airborne Division at Fort Bragg, North Carolina in 1972.

In 1973, Robinson was promoted to Brigadier General and, in 1975, became commanding general of the United States Army Garrison, Okinawa. In 1976, he was promoted to Major General and assigned to command the 82nd Airborne Division at Fort Bragg.  General Robinson was the first African American to command the 82nd Airborne Division. He then served as Deputy Chief of Staff for Operations, United States Army Europe and Seventh Army. Promoted to Lieutenant General in 1980, Robinson served as the commanding general of United States Army, Japan and IX Corps He was subsequently awarded the Army Distinguished Service Medal in 1983.

His final assignment was as U.S. Military Representative to the NATO Military Committee from 1982–1985. After he had completed 34 years of service to the U.S. military he retired on November 30, 1985. He was then awarded with the Defense Distinguished Service Medal and a second Army Distinguished Service Medal.

Awards and decorations

Later life and legacy 
After his retirement, he was asked to look over a panel of people who were examining the Korean War performance of some highly criticized army units. He also served on the board of Northwest Airlines. Robinson and his wife Mildred lived in Falls Church, Virginia. After a battle with leukemia, Robinson died on July 22, 1993 at the Walter Reed Army Hospital in Washington, D.C., at the age of 64, and was buried at Arlington National Cemetery. In April 2000, there was a ceremony and a dedication at West Point for a new auditorium, named the "General Roscoe Robinson Jr. Auditorium" in his honor. The Roscoe Robinson Health Clinic at Womack Army Medical Center at Fort Bragg is also named in his honor.

References

 Father Ryan High School – Black Military History – African Americans in the service of their country
 Roscoe Robinson Jr. Encyclopædia Britannica

External links
 Roscoe Robinson Jr. at ArlingtonCemetery.net, an unofficial website
 

1928 births
1993 deaths
Sumner High School (St. Louis) alumni
Harris–Stowe State University alumni
Saint Louis University alumni
United States Military Academy alumni
Military personnel from St. Louis
African-American United States Army personnel
United States Army personnel of the Korean War
African Americans in the Korean War
United States Army Command and General Staff College alumni
University of Pittsburgh alumni
United States Army personnel of the Vietnam War
African Americans in the Vietnam War
Recipients of the Air Medal
Recipients of the Distinguished Flying Cross (United States)
Recipients of the Silver Star
Recipients of the Gallantry Cross (Vietnam)
National War College alumni
Recipients of the Legion of Merit
United States Army generals
Recipients of the Distinguished Service Medal (US Army)
Recipients of the Defense Distinguished Service Medal
People from Falls Church, Virginia
Burials at Arlington National Cemetery